Martin Musto is a British-born theatre practitioner based in Oslo, Norway. His work for one of Oslo's National Theatres (Det Norske Teatret) includes, Rainer Werner Fassbinder's play, Fear Eats The Soul, Ivar Lindberg's production of Tusen år og like blid and the televised production of The triumph of Love. In the mid 90s he worked for the Norwegian national film company, Norsk Film, as Construction Manager, on films such as The Sunset Boys, starring Robert Mitchum and Cliff Roberson and Zero Kelvin.  
In 2008, Musto collaborated with the Norwegian Arts Council and international artists, Jacques Lasalle and Silvio Pukarete to create new drama as well as seminars for the 2008 Nordic Showcase
In 2008 Musto directed the Scandinavian premiere of the Joe Penhall play Blue Orange with Isaka Sawadogo playing the lead role and in 2014, he travelled to Soweto in South Africa as Production Designer for the Soweto Theatre's adaptation of Arthur Schnitzler's La Ronde, retitled to Are You Dik?

Personal life
His father, John Musto died in 2013, at the age of 81 in Grangetown. Martin has one sister, Margret.

Credits

References

External links
 Martin Musto at Sceneweb

Theatre in Norway
Living people
Year of birth missing (living people)